Akeel Al Saffar (عقيل الصفار) is an Iraqi politician. Al Saffar lived in exile for decades because of the regime of Saddam Hussein. He currently works as Deputy Minister for National Security Affairs. 

Al Saffar's first name is sometimes rendered as Aqeel.

Political career
Al Saffar was in exile from the early years of the regime of Saddam Hussein. This meant he, nor many other Iraqi politicians could take part in Iraqi politics. 
 
He is currently the Deputy Minister for National Security Affairs.

References

Politics of Iraq

Iraqi politicians